Bukat (also Romanized as Būkat, Būket, and Booket; also known as Boviat) is a village in Dizajrud-e Sharqi Rural District, Qaleh Chay District, Ajab Shir County, East Azerbaijan Province, Iran. At the 2006 census, its population was 699, in 167 families.

References 

Populated places in Ajab Shir County